Knema rubens is a species of plant in the family Myristicaceae. It is found in Indonesia, Malaysia, and Singapore.

References

rubens
Trees of Malesia
Least concern plants
Taxonomy articles created by Polbot
Taxa named by James Sinclair (botanist)